Baelelea (Mbaelelea) is a Southeast Solomonic language of Malaita.

References

Malaita languages